Malcolm III (died 13 November 1093) was King of Scotland from 1058 to 1093. He was later nicknamed "Canmore" ("ceann mòr", Gaelic, literally "big head"; Gaelic meaning and understood as "great chief"). Malcolm's long reign of 35 years preceded the beginning of the Scoto-Norman age. Henry I of England and Eustace III of Boulogne were his sons-in-law, making him the maternal grandfather of Empress Matilda, William Adelin and Matilda of Boulogne. All three of them were prominent in English politics during the 12th century.

Malcolm's kingdom did not extend over the full territory of modern Scotland: many of the islands and the land north of the River Oykel were Scandinavian, and south of the Firth of Forth there were numerous independent or semi-independent realms, including the kingdom of Strathclyde and Bamburgh, and it is not certain what if any power the Scots exerted there on Malcolm's accession. Over the course of his reign Malcolm III led at least five invasions into English territory. One of Malcolm's primary achievements was to secure the position of the lineage that ruled Scotland until the late thirteenth century, although his role as founder of a dynasty has more to do with the propaganda of his descendants than with history. Malcolm's second wife, Margaret, was canonised as a saint in the thirteenth century.

Background

Malcolm's father Duncan I became king in late 1034, on the death of Malcolm II, Duncan's maternal grandfather and Malcolm's great-grandfather. One Scottish king-list gives Malcolm's mother the name Suthen (Suthain), a Gaelic name; John of Fordun states that Malcolm's mother was a 'blood relative' (consanguinea) of the Danish earl Siward, though this may be a late attempt to deepen the Scottish royal family's links to the earldom of Northampton (of which Siward was regarded as founder). Later tradition, attested by the fifteenth century, makes Malcolm's mother the daughter of the miller of Forteviot, and presents Malcolm as a bastard.

Duncan's reign was not successful and he was killed in battle with the men of Moray, led by Macbeth, on 15 August 1040. Duncan was young at the time of his death, and Malcolm and his brother Donald were probably children. Malcolm's paternal grandfather was killed in battle in 1045, possibly as part of some continuing conflict with Macbeth.

According to later tradition, Duncan's two young sons were sent away for greater safety—exactly where is the subject of debate. According to one version, Malcolm's brother Donald was sent to the Isles; and Malcolm was sent to England; based on Fordun's account, it came to be assumed that Malcolm passed most of Macbeth's seventeen-year reign in the Kingdom of England at the court of Edward the Confessor. It is also possible that Malcolm went into exile at the court of Thorfinn Sigurdsson, Earl of Orkney, an enemy of Macbeth's family. Ireland and Strathclyde may be other candidates, but neither the place of exile, nor in fact exile itself, are certainties. 

An English invasion in 1054, with Siward, Earl of Northumbria in command, had as its goal the installation of one "Máel Coluim, son of the king of the Cumbrians". This Máel Coluim was traditionally identified with the later Malcolm III. The interpretation derives from the Chronicle attributed to  John of Fordun, as well as from earlier sources such as William of Malmesbury. The latter reported that Macbeth was killed in the battle by Siward, but it is known that Macbeth outlived Siward by two years. A. A. M. Duncan argued in 2002 that, using the Anglo-Saxon Chronicle entry as their source, later writers innocently misidentified "Máel Coluim" with the later Scottish king of the same name. Duncan's argument has been supported by several subsequent historians specialising in the era, such as Richard Oram, Dauvit Broun and Alex Woolf. It has also been suggested that Máel Coluim may have been a son of Owain Foel, British king of Strathclyde perhaps by a daughter of Malcolm II, King of Scotland.

In 1057, various chroniclers report the death of Macbeth at Malcolm's hand, on 15 August 1057 at Lumphanan in Aberdeenshire. Macbeth was succeeded by his stepson Lulach, who was crowned at Scone, probably on 8 September 1057. Lulach was killed by Malcolm, "by treachery", near Huntly on 23 April 1058. After this, Malcolm became king, perhaps being inaugurated on 25 April 1058, although only John of Fordun reports this.

Early reign
If Orderic Vitalis is to be relied upon, in the time of Edward the Confessor Malcolm was betrothed to the English king's kinswoman Margaret, and it is possible this happened when he visited England in 1059. If a marriage agreement was made in 1059, it did not stop the Scots plundering Lindisfarne in 1061. It was common practice in medieval Gaelic-speaking societies for kings to launch an invasion, the so-called crech ríg, of a neighbour soon after taking power, and the Lindisfarne raid may have been used to boost the stability of the new regime. Since the invasion affected directly only the territory of the rulers of Bamburgh, it is unlikely to have particularly bothered either King Edward or the ealdorman of Northumbria in York, Tostig Godwinson, who at that time on pilgrimage to Rome and who did not enjoy a good relationship with the Bamburgh family. Malcolm may have had specific political motives. For instance, it has been suggested that he may have been trying to advance the position of Gospatric, his possible cousin, at the expense of the ruling Eadwulfing family. It has also been suggested that the raid may have been part of a dispute about the status of Strathclyde. 

A tradition in the thirteenth-century Orkneyinga saga related that Malcolm married the widow of Thorfinn Sigurdsson, Ingibiorg, a daughter of Finn Arnesson. Ingibiorg may have died prior to Malcolm's marriage with Margaret. Malcolm may also have discarded Ingibiorg when the opportunity to marry a higher status lady arose in 1068. The Orkneyinga Saga also claims that Duncan (Donnchad mac Maíl Coluim), later king, was a product of this union. Some Medieval commentators, following William of Malmesbury, claimed that Duncan was illegitimate, but this claim is propaganda reflecting the need of Malcolm's descendants by Margaret to undermine the claims of Duncan's descendants, the MacWilliams. Similarly, however, the importance of the MacWilliams to the earls of Orkney around 1200 would have provided an incentive to strengthen the historical ties between the two families, and thus Ingibiorg's marriage to Malcolm may have been created for the purpose of fabricating common descent. 

The obituary of a certain Domnall, another of son of Malcolm, is reported in 1085; since Domnall has no recorded mother, he may also have been born to Ingibiorg or else to some other unrecorded woman. If historical, Malcolm's marriage to Ingibiorg would have helped create a favourable political position in the north and west. The Heimskringla tells that her father Finn had been an adviser to Harald Hardrada and, after falling out with Harald, was then made an Earl by Sweyn Estridsson, King of Denmark, which may have been another recommendation for the match. Malcolm appears to have enjoyed a peaceful relationship  with the Earldom of Orkney, ruled jointly by his possible stepsons, Paul and Erlend Thorfinnsson. The Orkneyinga Saga reports strife with Norway but this is may be misplaced as it associates this with Magnus Barefoot, who became king of Norway only in 1093, the year of Malcolm's death.

Malcolm gave sanctuary to Tostig Godwinson when the Northumbrians drove him out in 1065, and appears to have offered indirect support to the ill-fated invasion of England by Harald Hardrada and Tostig in 1066, which ended in defeat and death at the battle of Stamford Bridge. In 1068, he granted asylum to a group of English exiles fleeing from William of Normandy, among them Agatha, widow of Edward the Confessor's nephew Edward the Exile, and her children: Edgar Ætheling and his sisters Margaret and Cristina. They were accompanied by Gospatric, by this time earl of Bamburgh. The exiles were disappointed, however, if they had expected immediate assistance from the Scots.

Marriage to Margaret

In 1069, the exiles returned to England, to join a spreading revolt in the north. Even though Gospatric and Siward's son Waltheof submitted by the end of the year, the arrival of a Danish army under Sweyn Estridsson seemed to ensure that William's position remained weak. Malcolm decided on war, and took his army south into Cumbria and across the Pennines, wasting Teesdale and Cleveland then marching north, loaded with loot, to Wearmouth, now part of the City of Sunderland. There Malcolm met Edgar and his family, who were invited to return with him, but did not. As Sweyn had by now been bought off with a large Danegeld, Malcolm took his army home. Against the backdrop of William's scorched earth policy against the northern English rebels, William sent Gospatric to raid Scotland through Cumbria as a further act of reprisal. In return, the Scots fleet raided the Northumbrian coast where Gospatric's possessions were concentrated. Late in the year, perhaps shipwrecked on their way to a European exile, Edgar and his family again arrived in Scotland, this time to remain. By the end of 1070, Malcolm had married Edgar's sister Margaret (later known as Saint Margaret).

The naming of their children represented a break with the traditional Scots regal names such as Malcolm, Cináed and Áed. The point of naming Margaret's sons—Edward after her father Edward the Exile, Edmund for her grandfather Edmund Ironside, Ethelred for her great-grandfather Ethelred the Unready and Edgar for her great-great-grandfather Edgar and her brother, briefly the elected king, Edgar Ætheling—was unlikely to be missed in England, where William of Normandy's grasp on power was far from secure. Whether the adoption of the classical Alexander for the future Alexander I of Scotland (either for Pope Alexander II or for Alexander the Great) and the biblical David for the future David I of Scotland represented a recognition that William of Normandy would not be easily removed, or was due to the repetition of Anglo-Saxon royal names—another Edmund had preceded Edgar—is not known. Margaret also gave Malcolm two daughters, Edith, who married Henry I of England, and Mary, who married Eustace III of Boulogne.

In 1072, with the Harrying of the North completed and his position again secure, William of Normandy came north with an army and a fleet. Malcolm met William at Abernethy and, in the words of the Anglo-Saxon Chronicle, "became his man" and handed over his eldest son Duncan as a hostage and arranged peace between William and Edgar. Accepting the overlordship of the king of the English was no novelty, as previous kings had done so without result. The same was true of Malcolm; his agreement with the English king was followed by further raids into Northumbria, which led to further trouble in the earldom and the killing of Bishop Walcher at Gateshead. In 1080, William sent his son Robert Curthose north with an army while his brother Odo punished the Northumbrians. Malcolm again made peace, and this time kept it for over a decade.

Malcolm faced little recorded internal opposition, with the exception of Lulach's son Máel Snechtai. In an unusual entry, for the Anglo-Saxon Chronicle contains little on Scotland, it says that in 1078:

Whatever provoked this strife, Máel Snechtai survived until 1085.

Malcolm and William Rufus

When William Rufus became king of England after his father's death, Malcolm did not intervene in the rebellions by supporters of Robert Curthose which followed. In 1091, William Rufus confiscated Edgar Ætheling's lands in England, and Edgar fled north to Scotland. In May, Malcolm marched south, not to raid and take slaves and plunder, but to besiege Newcastle, built by Robert Curthose in 1080. This appears to have been an attempt to advance the frontier south from the River Tweed to the River Tees. The threat was enough to bring the English king back from Normandy, where he had been fighting Robert Curthose. In September, learning of William Rufus's approaching army, Malcolm withdrew north and the English followed. Unlike in 1072, Malcolm was prepared to fight, but a peace was arranged by Edgar Ætheling and Robert Curthose whereby Malcolm again acknowledged the overlordship of the English king.

In 1092, the peace began to break down. Based on the idea that the Scots controlled much of modern Cumbria, it had been supposed that William Rufus's new castle at Carlisle and his settlement of English peasants in the surrounds was the cause. It is unlikely that Malcolm controlled Cumbria, and the dispute instead concerned the estates granted to Malcolm by William Rufus's father in 1072 for his maintenance when visiting England. Malcolm sent messengers to discuss the question and William Rufus agreed to a meeting. Malcolm travelled south to Gloucester, stopping at Wilton Abbey to visit his daughter Edith and sister-in-law Cristina. Malcolm arrived there on 24 August 1093 to find that William Rufus refused to negotiate, insisting that the dispute be judged by the English barons. This Malcolm refused to accept, and returned immediately to Scotland.

It does not appear that William Rufus intended to provoke a war, but, as the Anglo-Saxon Chronicle reports, war came:
Malcolm was accompanied by Edward, his eldest son by Margaret and probable heir-designate (or tánaiste), and by Edgar. Even by the standards of the time, the ravaging of Northumbria by the Scots was seen as harsh.

Death

While marching north again, Malcolm was ambushed by Robert de Mowbray, Earl of Northumbria, whose lands he had devastated, near Alnwick on 13 November 1093. There he was killed by Arkil Morel, steward of Bamburgh Castle. The conflict became known as the Battle of Alnwick. Edward was mortally wounded in the same fight. Margaret, it is said, died soon after receiving the news of their deaths from Edgar. The Annals of Ulster say:

Malcolm's body was taken to Tynemouth Priory for burial. The king's body was sent north for reburial, in the reign of his son Alexander, at Dunfermline Abbey, or possibly Iona.

On 19 June 1250, following the canonisation of Malcolm's wife Margaret by Pope Innocent IV, Margaret's remains were disinterred and placed in a reliquary. Tradition has it that as the reliquary was carried to the high altar of Dunfermline Abbey, past Malcolm's grave, it became too heavy to move. As a result, Malcolm's remains were also disinterred, and buried next to Margaret beside the altar.

Issue
Malcolm and Ingibiorg had three sons:
 Duncan II of Scotland, succeeded his father as King of Scotland
  Donald, died ca. 1094
  Malcolm, died ca. 1085 (apocryphal)

Malcolm and Margaret had eight children, six sons and two daughters:
 Edward, killed 1093
 Edmund of Scotland
 Ethelred, abbot of Dunkeld
 King Edgar of Scotland
 King Alexander I of Scotland
 Matilda of Scotland, married Henry I of England
 Mary of Scotland, married Eustace III of Boulogne
 King David I of Scotland

Depictions in fiction

Malcolm appears in William Shakespeare’s Macbeth as Malcolm.  He is the son of King Duncan and heir to the throne. He first appears in the second scene where he is talking to a sergeant, with Duncan. The sergeant tells them how the battle was won thanks to Macbeth. Then Ross comes and Duncan decides that Macbeth should take the title of Thane of Cawdor. Then he later appears in Act 1.4 talking about the execution of the former Thane of Cawdor. Macbeth then enters and they congratulate him on his victory. He later appears in Macbeth's castle as a guest. When his father is killed he is suspected of the murder so he escapes to England. He later makes an appearance in Act 4.3, where he talks to Macduff about Macbeth and what to do. They both decide to start a war against him. In Act 5.4 he is seen in Dunsinane getting ready for war. He orders the troops to hide behind branches and slowly advance towards the castle. In Act 5.8 he watches the battle against Macbeth and Macduff with Siward and Ross. When eventually Macbeth is killed, Malcolm takes over as king.

The married life of Malcolm III and Margaret has been the subject of three historical novels: A Goodly Pearl (1905) by Mary H. Debenham, Malcolm Canmore's Pearl (1907) by Agnes Grant Hay, and Sing, Morning Star by Jane Oliver (1949).   They focus on court life in Dunfermline, and Margaret helping introduce Anglo-Saxon culture in Scotland. The latter two novels cover events to 1093, ending with Malcolm's death.  Malcolm's conflict with William the Conqueror is depicted in the screenplay, Malcolm Son of Duncan, by Laura Ballou which is part of the reading reference library at the Clan Donnachaidh Society Center in Perthshire, Scotland.

Malcolm III was depicted by Nigel Tranter in his novels MacBeth the King and Margaret the Queen as the bastard son of Duncan I and the daughter of a miller at Forteviot. He was depicted as being a fan of everything Anglo-Saxon in the latter novel.

Malcolm Canmore, King of Scots, and his court at Dunfermline are depicted in the novel The Refuge by Regan Walker

In the Disney animated series Gargoyles,  Malcolm makes an appearance as the young son of King Duncan known simply as "Canmore". He is exiled to England after his father is killed in battle by Macbeth. Upon his return to claim the Scottish throne he takes up the mantle of the "Hunter" and destroys the last of the few remaining gargoyle clans of Scotland.

Notes

References

Anderson, Alan Orr, Early Sources of Scottish History A.D 500–1286, volume 1. Reprinted with corrections. Paul Watkins, Stamford, 1990. 
Anderson, Alan Orr, Scottish Annals from English Chroniclers. D. Nutt, London, 1908.
Anderson, Marjorie Ogilvie, Kings and Kingship in Early Scotland. Scottish Academic Press, Edinburgh, revised edition 1980. 
Anon., Orkneyinga Saga: The History of the Earls of Orkney, tr. Hermann Pálsson and Paul Edwards. Penguin, London, 1978. 
 
Barrell, A.D.M. Medieval Scotland. Cambridge University Press, Cambridge, 2000. 
Barrow, G.W.S., Kingship and Unity: Scotland, 1000–1306. Reprinted, Edinburgh University Press, Edinburgh, 1989. 
 Barrow, G.W.S., The Kingdom of the Scots. Edinburgh University Press, Edinburgh, 2003. 
 Broun, Dauvit, The Irish Identity of the Kingdom of the Scots in the Twelfth and Thirteenth Centuries. Boydell, Woodbridge, 1999. 
 Burton, John Hill, The History of Scotland, New Edition, 8 vols, Edinburgh 1876
Clancy, Thomas Owen, "St. Margaret" in Michael Lynch (ed.), The Oxford Companion to Scottish History. Oxford University Press, Oxford, 2002. 
 Duncan, A.A.M., The Kingship of the Scots 842–1292: Succession and Independence. Edinburgh University Press, Edinburgh, 2002. 
Dunlop, Eileen, Queen Margaret of Scotland. National Museums of Scotland, Edinburgh, 2005. 
Hammond, Matthew H., "Ethnicity and Writing of Medieval Scottish History", in The Scottish Historical Review, Vol. 85, April 2006, pp. 1–27
John of Fordun, Chronicle of the Scottish Nation, ed. William Forbes Skene, tr. Felix J.H. Skene, 2 vols. Reprinted, Llanerch Press, Lampeter, 1993. 
 Magnusson, Magnus, Scotland: The Story of a Nation. Atlantic Monthly Press, 2000.  * McDonald, R. Andrew, The Kingdom of the Isles: Scotland's Western Seaboard, c. 1100–c.1336. Tuckwell Press, East Linton, 1997. 
 McDonald, R. Andrew, Outlaws of Medieval Scotland: Challenges to the Canmore Kings, 1058–1266. Tuckwell Press, East Linton, 2003. 
 

 Oram, Richard, David I: The King Who Made Scotland. Tempus, Stroud, 2004. 
 
 Purdie, Rhiannon,  'Malcolm, Margaret, Macbeth and the Miller', Medievalia et Humanistica, Vol. New Series, 41 (2015), pp. 45–63
 Reid, Norman, "Kings and Kingship: Canmore Dynasty" in Michael Lynch (ed.), op. cit.
 Ritchie, R. L. Graeme, The Normans in Scotland, Edinburgh University Press, 1954
 Sturluson, Snorri, Heimskringla: History of the Kings of Norway, tr. Lee M. Hollander. Reprinted University of Texas Press, Austin, 1992. 
 Young, James, ed., Historical References to the Scottish Family of Lauder, Glasgow, 1884

External links
 Malcolm III at the official website of the British monarchy
 
Orkneyinga Saga at Northvegr
CELT: Corpus of Electronic Texts at University College Cork includes the Annals of Ulster, Tigernach and Innisfallen, the Lebor Bretnach and the Chronicon Scotorum among others. Most are translated or translations are in progress.

1093 deaths
11th-century Scottish monarchs
House of Dunkeld
Monarchs killed in action
People from Alnwick
Burials at Tynemouth Priory
Burials at Dunfermline Abbey
Scottish pre-union military personnel killed in action
Gaelic monarchs in Scotland
Royal reburials